Daniel Levin is a Swiss-American writer, attorney, and political commentator.

Early life and education 
Levin grew up in the Middle East, Kenya, and Switzerland. He received his legal education at the University of Zurich, Switzerland (lic. iur./J.D. 1988 and Dr. iur./PhD 1990) and Columbia University School of Law (LL.M. 1993).

Career 
Levin is a member of the board of the Liechtenstein Foundation for State Governance. He is a frequent lecturer and political commentator.

Books 
 Nothing But a Circus: Misadventures Among the Powerful Penguin Politica, 2017

 Proof of Life: Twenty Days on the Hunt for a Missing Person in the Middle East Workman Publishing, 2021
 Milenas Versprechen Elster & Salis, 2021

References

External links 

21st-century Swiss writers
21st-century American male writers
University of Zurich alumni
Living people
Columbia Law School alumni
Year of birth missing (living people)